Lubao Institute or L.I. is located in San Nicolas 1st, Lubao, Pampanga. Established in February 1929, it is the first and oldest private school in Lubao.

History

Founded in February 1929 by the late Engr. Justo S. Arrastia, Dr. Faustino F. Turla, Dr. Jose Punsalang, Mr. Benigno R. Fajardo, Ms. Germogena Vitug and Mr. Nicasio Vitug, offered in 1929-1930 the 1st 2 classes of 1st and 2nd years at the Ibarra residence in Bo. San Nicolas 1st. Erected semi-permanently at the Cosiongco-Si lot from June 1930 to December 1941.

Stripped of its building by the colonizer-preachers of the Asian co-prosperity sphere and World War II looters from 1942 to 1944, sought refuge at the St. Augustine Parish Convent from 1945 to 1950.

Relocated at its permanent site in 1950 through the efforts of the late Mr. Jeremias Angeles Garcia Sr., expanded through the initiative and dedication of Mrs. Maria Tolentino - Garcia and their son Mr. Jeremias Tolentino Garcia Jr.

Notable alumni

Arwind Santos, basketball player
Rogelio de la Rosa, Actor and former Senator of the Philippines
Jaime de la Rosa, Actor
Amelita Tolentino, is a Filipina lawyer. Tolentino was appointed Court of Appeals associate justice on Aug. 27, 2001. She was Bar reviewer and professor of law and political science. She was the judge on the Vizconde Masaccare.
Billy Bansil, former player of Pampanga Dragons
Dexter Maiquez, former PBA player 
Ian Sangalang,  is a Filipino professional basketball player currently playing for the Magnolia Hotshots of the Philippine Basketball Association (PBA). He was drafted 2nd overall by the Mixers in the 2013 PBA draft.

Images

References

Schools in Pampanga
Private schools in the Philippines
Educational institutions established in 1929
1929 establishments in the Philippines